The women's 400 metres hurdles event at the 1999 Summer Universiade was held on 9 and 10 July at the Estadio Son Moix in Palma de Mallorca, Spain.

Medalists

Results

Heats
Held on 9 July

Semifinals
Held on 9 July

Final
Held on 10 July

References

Athletics at the 1999 Summer Universiade
1999 in women's athletics
1999